Kim Deok-ju (29 September 1933 – 5 January 2023) was a South Korean lawyer and judge. He served as Chief Justice of the Supreme Court of Korea from 1990 to 1993.

Kim died on 5 January 2023, at the age of 89.

References

1933 births
2023 deaths
South Korean judges
Chief justices of the Supreme Court of Korea
Justices of the Supreme Court of Korea
Seoul National University School of Law alumni
People from Buyeo County